Notophilus may refer to:
 Notophilus, a genus of beetles in the family Carabidae; synonym of Amblystomus
 Notophilus, a genus of flowering plants in the family Ranunculaceae; synonym of Ranunculus